Shailendra Kumar Upadhyay Dahal (April 17, 1929 – May 9, 2011) was a Nepalese politician. He was Minister of Foreign Affairs for Nepal from 1986 to 1990. He was Nepal's Ambassador and Permanent Representative to the United Nations from 1972 to 1978. He also held positions such as Defense Minister, Interior Minister, and the King's Royal Adviser.

Upadhyay was born in exile in Karnol, Saheb Ganj, India, due to the Kshatriya seizure of the Nepalese government in 1846. He died on May 9, 2011, in an attempt to become the oldest person to climb Mount Everest.

See also
List of people who died climbing Mount Everest

References

External links

 Shailendra Kumar Upadhyay – Obituary & Video Interviews

1929 births
2011 deaths
Foreign Ministers of Nepal
Mountaineering deaths on Mount Everest
Permanent Representatives of Nepal to the United Nations